83rd parallel may refer to:

83rd parallel north, a circle of latitude in the Northern Hemisphere
83rd parallel south, a circle of latitude in the Southern Hemisphere, in Antarctica